The 2016 League 1 Cup known as the 2016 iPro Sport cup for sponsorship reasons is the second playing of the competition, first played in 2015.

The competition is for the rugby league clubs in the British League 1 - the third tier of rugby league in Britain.  As there are 15 teams in League 1 but French club Toulouse Olympique declined to enter the tournament, two amateur teams were invited into the competition to bring the numbers to 16.  In 2016 these clubs were Wath Brow Hornets and Leigh Miners Rangers.

Teams

First round
The first round draw of the 2016 iPro Sport Cup was broadcast live on BBC Radio Newcastle on Thursday November 26 from 6.45pm. Last year’s winners, North Wales Crusaders,  joined the other 13 Kingstone Press League 1 clubs and Kingstone Press National Conference League teams Leigh Miners Rangers and Wath Brow Hornets in the bag from which eight ties  played over the weekend of February 20–21 will be selected.

The draw was made by former England, Huddersfield Giants, Hull FC and York City Knights player Chris Thorman and BBC Newcastle presenter and former footballer John Anderson . For the first round the teams were split into two pools – Pool A (Northern regions) and Pool B (Midlands and Southern regions).

Pool A

Pool B

Second round
The second round draw took place on Sunday February 21 live on BBC Radio Leeds. Home teams were drawn by former Great Britain and Leeds Rhinos player Francis Cummins; the away teams by BBC Radio Leeds presenter James Deighton.

Semi finals
The draw for the semi-finals was made on 3 April 2016.

Final

References

RFL League 1
2016 in English rugby league
2016 in Welsh rugby league